Justice Wood may refer to:

 Carroll D. Wood, associate justice of the Arkansas Supreme Court
 Georgina Theodora Wood, chief justice of Supreme Court of Ghana
 James Roland Wood, judge of the Supreme Court of New South Wales
 Reuben Wood, associate justice of the Ohio Supreme Court
 Rhonda K. Wood, associate justice of the Arkansas Supreme Court
 William Wood, 1st Baron Hatherley, Lord Chancellor of Britain

See also
Judge Wood (disambiguation)
 Justice Woods (disambiguation)
 William Burnham Woods, associate justice of the United States Supreme Court